The history of Nintendo begins in 1889, founded to produce handmade  playing cards. In the mid-1900s, the company licensed third-party card graphics, such as Disney characters. In the 1960s, it expanded into countless varieties of toys, including original designs by Gunpei Yokoi. In the 1980s, it became one of the most prominent figures in the video game industry including designs by Shigeru Miyamoto such as mascot Mario and breakthrough hit arcade video game Donkey Kong.  is now the largest video game company by revenue, as a Japanese  multinational consumer electronics company headquartered in Kyoto, Japan.

1889–1949: Hanafuda cards 

Based in Kyoto, Japan, the business produced and marketed . The name "Nintendo" is commonly assumed to mean "leave luck to heaven", but there are no historical records to validate this assumption. The cards, which were all handmade, soon began to gain in popularity, and Yamauchi had to hire assistants to mass-produce cards to keep up with the demand.

Fusajiro Yamauchi did not have a son to take over the family business. Following the common Japanese tradition, he adopted his son-in-law, Sekiryo Kaneda, who then legally took his wife's last name of Yamauchi. In 1929, Fusajiro Yamauchi retired from the company and allowed Sekiryo Kaneda to take over the company as president. In 1933, Sekiryo Kaneda established a joint venture with another company and renamed the company Yamauchi Nintendo & Co.

Sekiryo Kaneda also had only daughters, so again his son-in-law (Shikanojo Inaba, renamed Shikanojo Yamauchi) was adopted into the family. Shikanojo later abandoned his family and did not become company president. Subsequently, his son Hiroshi Yamauchi was brought up by his grandparents and he later took over the company instead of his father.

1949–1965: Disney tie-in and public listing

In 1949, Hiroshi Yamauchi attended Waseda University in Tokyo. However, after his grandfather suffered a debilitating stroke, he left to take office as the president of Nintendo. In 1953, Nintendo became the first company in Japan to produce playing cards from plastic.

In 1956, Yamauchi visited the U.S., to engage in talks with the United States Playing Card Company (USPCC), the dominant playing card manufacturer in the United States, based in Cincinnati. He was shocked to find that the world's biggest company in his business was relegated to using a small office. This was a turning point for Yamauchi, who then realized the limitations of the playing card business.

In 1958, Nintendo made a deal with Disney to allow the use of Disney's characters on Nintendo's playing cards. By tying playing cards to Disney and selling books explaining the different games one could play with the cards, Nintendo could sell the product to Japanese households. The tie-in was a success and the company sold at least 600,000 card packs in a single year. Due to this success, in 1962, Yamauchi took Nintendo public, listing the company in Osaka Stock Exchange Second division.

In 1963, Nintendo Playing Card Co., Ltd. was renamed to Nintendo by Yamauchi. Nintendo now began to experiment in other areas of business using the newly injected capital. This included establishing a food company in partnership with two other firms with a product line featuring instant rice (similar to instant noodles), a vacuum cleaner, and Chiritory (which later appeared in a two-player minigame in WarioWare, Inc.: Mega Microgame$ in 2003). All these ventures eventually failed, except toymaking, based on some earlier experience from selling playing cards. In 1964, while Japan was experiencing an economic boom due to the Tokyo Olympics, the playing card business reached saturation. Japanese households stopped buying playing cards, and the price of Nintendo stock fell from 900 yen to 60 yen.

In 1965, Nintendo hired Gunpei Yokoi as a maintenance engineer for the assembly line. However, Yokoi soon became famous for much more than his ability to repair conveyor belts.

1966–1972: Toy company and new ventures

During the 1960s, Nintendo struggled to survive in the Japanese toy industry, which was still small at this point, and already dominated by already well-established companies such as Bandai and Tomy. Because of the generally short product life cycle of toys, the company took the approach of introducing new products at a quicker rate, marking the start of a major new era for Nintendo.

In 1966, Yamauchi, upon visiting one of the company's  factories, noticed an extending arm-shaped toy, which had been made by one of its maintenance engineers, Gunpei Yokoi, for fun. Yamauchi ordered Yokoi to develop it as a proper product for the Christmas rush. Released as the Ultra Hand, it became one of Nintendo's earliest toy blockbusters, selling over hundreds of thousands units. Seeing that Yokoi had potential, Yamauchi pulled him off assembly line work. Yokoi was soon moved from maintenance duty to product development.

Due to his electrical engineering background, it soon became apparent that Yokoi was quite adept at developing electronic toys. These devices had a much higher novelty value than traditional toys, allowing Nintendo to charge a higher price margin for each product. Yokoi went on to develop many other toys, including the Ten Billion Barrel puzzle, a baseball throwing machine called the Ultra Machine, and a Love Tester.

Nintendo released the first solar-powered light gun, the Nintendo Beam Gun, in 1970; this was the first commercially available light-gun for home use, produced in partnership with Sharp.

In 1972, Nintendo released the Ele-Conga, one of the first programmable drum machines. It plays pre-programmed rhythms from disc-shaped punch cards, which can be altered or programmed by the user, to play different patterns.

1972–present: Video game manufacturer

1972–1992: Arcade games, Color TV-Game, and Game & Watch 

In 1972, the first commercially available video game console, the Magnavox Odyssey, has a light gun accessory, the Shooting Gallery. This was the first involvement of Nintendo in video games. According to Martin Picard in the International Journal of Computer Game Research: "in 1971, Nintendo had -- even before the marketing of the first home console in the United States -- an alliance with the American pioneer Magnavox to develop and produce optoelectronic guns for the Odyssey (released in 1972), since it was similar to what Nintendo was able to offer in the Japanese toy market in 1970s".

In 1973, its focus shifted to family-friendly arcades with the Laser Clay Shooting System, using the same light gun technology used in Nintendo's Kousenjuu series of toys, and set up in abandoned bowling alleys. Gaining some success, Nintendo developed several more light gun machines for the emerging arcade scene. While the Laser Clay Shooting System ranges had to be shut down following excessive costs, Nintendo had founded a new market.

Nintendo also began to enter the video game market. Its first steps in that field were to acquire the rights to distribute the Magnavox Odyssey in Japan in 1974 and to release its first video arcade game, EVR Race, in 1975. In 1977, Nintendo released the Color TV-Game 6 and Color TV-Game 15, two consoles jointly developed with Mitsubishi Electric. The numbers in the console names indicated the amount of games included in each.

In the early 1980s, Nintendo's video game division (led by Yokoi) created some of its most famous arcade games. The massively popular Donkey Kong was designed by Shigeru Miyamoto and released in arcades in 1981. Home releases soon followed, with versions being made by Coleco for the Atari 2600, Intellivision, and ColecoVision video game systems. Some of Nintendo's other arcade games would also be ported to home consoles by third parties, including Donkey Kong Jr., Sky Skipper, Mario Bros., and Donkey Kong 3. Despite the success, Nintendo would start to shift more focus to the home game market. Nintendo of Japan stopped manufacturing and releasing arcade games in Japan in Fall 1985, and withdrew its membership from the Japan Amusement Machinery Manufacturers Association (JAMMA) on February 28, 1989. On July 31, 1992, Nintendo of America announced it would no longer manufacture arcade equipment.

In addition to the arcade game activity, Nintendo was testing the consumer handheld video game waters with the Game & Watch. The Game & Watch is a line of handheld electronic games produced by Nintendo from 1980 to 1991. Created by game designer Gunpei Yokoi, each Game & Watch features a single game to be played on an LCD screen in addition to a clock and/or an alarm. It was the earliest Nintendo product to garner major success, with 43.4 million units sold worldwide.

1982–1988: Nintendo Entertainment System era

In 1982, Nintendo developed a prototype system called the Advanced Video System (AVS). Its accessories include controllers, a tape drive, a joystick, and a lightgun. The system can be used as a simple home computer. It was never released and is on display at the Nintendo World Store in New York. In July 1983, Nintendo released the Family Computer console in Japan, as its first attempt at a cartridge-based video game console. After a few months of favorable sales, Nintendo received complaints that some Famicom consoles would freeze on certain games. The fault was found in a malfunctioning chip and Nintendo decided to recall all Famicom units that were currently on store shelves, at a cost of approximately half a million USD.

During this period, Nintendo redesigned the Famicom as the Nintendo Entertainment System for launch in the US. Since the company had very little experience with the US market, it had previously attempted to contract with Atari for the system's distribution in 1983. However, a controversy involving Coleco and Donkey Kong soured the relationship between the two during the negotiations, and Atari refused to back Nintendo's console.

In 1983–1985, a large scale recession in video game sales hit the market which amounted to a 97% decrease primarily in the North American area. The recession known as the video game crash of 1983 was caused by a few main factors including the flooding of the console market, competition of home computers, inflation, and loss of publishing control. The video game crash of 1983 soon took out not only Atari, but the vast majority of the American market itself. Over time, dominance in the market shifted from America to Japan. Nintendo began exporting to America and had virtually only one major competitor in the market, Sega, which was another Japanese company.

Nintendo was determined not to make the same mistakes in the US that Atari had. Because of massive influxes of games that were regarded as some of the worst ever created, gaming had almost completely died out in America. Nintendo decided that to avoid facing the same problems, they would only allow games that received their "Seal of Quality" to be sold for the Famicom.

In 1985, Nintendo announced that they were releasing the Famicom (Family Computer) worldwide with a different design under the name the Nintendo Entertainment System (NES). They used a creative tactic to counter the bad view that the media was giving on video games, and released the NES with R.O.B. units that connected to the console and were synchronised to the games. To ensure the localization of the highest-quality games by third-party developers, Nintendo of America limited the number of game titles third-party developers could release in a single year to five. Konami, the first third-party company that was allowed to make cartridges for the Famicom, would later circumvent this rule by creating a spinoff company, Ultra Games, to release additional games in a single year. Other manufacturers soon employed the same tactic. Also in 1985, Super Mario Bros. was released for the Famicom in Japan and became a large success.

Nintendo test marketed the Nintendo Entertainment System in the New York area on October 18, 1985. They expanded the test to Los Angeles in February 1986, followed by tests in Chicago and San Francisco. They would go national by the end of 1986, along with 15 games, sold separately. In the US and Canada, it outsold its competitors by a wide margin. This was also the year that Metroid and The Legend of Zelda were released to much critical acclaim.

In 1988, Nintendo of America unveiled Nintendo Power, a monthly news and strategy magazine from Nintendo that served to advertise new games. The first issue published was the July/August edition, which spotlighted the NES game Super Mario Bros. 2 (Super Mario USA in Japan). Nintendo Power has since ceased publication with its December 2012 edition.

1989–1995: Game Boy, Super Nintendo Entertainment System, and Virtual Boy eras

In 1989, Nintendo (which had much success from the Game & Watch) released the Game Boy (both created by Gunpei Yokoi), along with the accompanying game Tetris. Due to the price, the game and its durability (unlike the prior Microvision from Milton Bradley Company, which was prone to static and screen rot), the Game Boy line sold extremely well, eventually amassing sales of 118 million units. Super Mario Land was also released with the system, which sold 14 million copies worldwide. 1989 was also the year that Nintendo announced a sequel to the Famicom, to be called the Super Famicom.

The last major first-party game for the NES, Super Mario Bros. 3, was released in early 1990 in North America, and went on to sell over 18 million units. It was followed by a licensed television adaption named The Super Mario Bros. Super Show!, which was released by DIC Entertainment and Viacom Enterprises in that year to capitalise on the game's immense popularity.

The Super Famicom was released in Japan on November 21, 1990. The system's launch was widely successful, and the Super Famicom was sold out across Japan within three days, selling 1.6 million units by June 1991. In August 1991, the Super Famicom was launched in the US under the name "Super Nintendo Entertainment System" (SNES), followed by Europe in 1992.

The Super Nintendo Entertainment System followed in the steps of its predecessor, with high technical specifications for its era. The controller of the SNES had also improved over that of the NES, as it now had rounded edges and four new buttons, a standard which is evident on many modern controllers today. The controller was called the "dog bone".

Nintendo had begun development on a CD-ROM attachment for the SNES/Super Famicom. Its first partner in this project was Sony, which had provided the SNES with its SPC sound chip. Development on the Nintendo PlayStation CD-ROM add-on and SNES/SFC standalone hybrid console began. However, at the last minute Nintendo decided to pull out of the partnership and instead go with Philips, and while no CD-ROM add-on was produced, several Nintendo properties (namely The Legend of Zelda) appeared on the Philips CD-i media console. Upon learning this, Sony decided to continue developing the technology they had into the PlayStation. The exact reason Nintendo left its partnership with Sony has been the subject of speculation over the years, but the most common theory is that Sony either wanted too much of the profits for the machine or the rights to the CD-ROM attachment itself.

In Japan, the Super Famicom easily took control of the gaming market. In the US, due to a late start and an aggressive marketing campaign by Sega (Headed by the Sega Company's new mascot, Sonic The Hedgehog, their answer to Nintendo's Super Mario), Nintendo's market share plunged from 90 to 95% with the NES to a low of approximately 35% against the Sega Genesis. Over the course of several years, the SNES in North America eventually overtook the Genesis, thanks to franchise titles such as Super Mario World, The Legend of Zelda: A Link to the Past, Street Fighter II, and the Final Fantasy series. Total worldwide sales of the SNES reached 49.10 million units, eclipsing the estimated 40 million unit sales of the Genesis.

As the SNES battled the Sega Genesis, Nintendo was running into problems on another front caused by their own aggressive marketing behavior. In 1991, Nintendo agreed to a settlement regarding price-fixing allegations brought by the Federal Trade Commission and attorneys general in New York and Maryland. Nintendo had been accused of threatening to cut off shipments of the NES to retailers who discounted the price of the system. The estimated cost of the settlement was just under $30 million.

In 1992, Gunpei Yokoi and the rest of R&D 1 began planning on a new stereoscopic 3D console to be called the Virtual Boy. Hiroshi Yamauchi also bought majority shares of the Seattle Mariners in 1992. By May 1993, Nintendo had reportedly become one of the top ten leading companies in the world.

In 1993, Nintendo announced plans to develop a new 64-bit console codenamed Project Reality, capable of rendering fully 3D environments and characters. In 1994, Nintendo also claimed that Project Reality would be renamed Ultra 64 in the US. The Ultra 64 moniker was unveiled in arcades on the Nintendo branded fighting game Killer Instinct and the racing game Cruis'n USA. Killer Instinct was later released on the SNES. Soon after, Nintendo realized they had mistakenly chosen a name for their new console that the Konami corporation owned the rights to. Specifically, only Konami would have the rights to release games for the new system called Ultra Football, Ultra Tennis, etc. Therefore, in 1995 Nintendo changed the final name of the system to Nintendo 64, and announced that it would be released in 1996. They later showed previews of the system and several games, including Super Mario 64, to the media and public. Also in 1995, Nintendo purchased part of Rare.

In 1994, after many years of Nintendo's products being distributed in Australia by Mattel since the NES in 1985, Nintendo opened its Australian headquarters and its first managing directors were Graham Kerry, who moved along from Mattel Australia as managing director and Susumu Tanaka of Nintendo UK Ltd.

In 1995, Nintendo released the Virtual Boy in Japan. The console sold poorly, but Nintendo still said they had hope for it and continued to release several other games and attempted a release in the US, which was another disaster.

Also in 1995, Nintendo found themselves in a competitive situation. Competitor Sega introduced their 32-bit Saturn, while newcomer Sony introduced the 32-bit PlayStation. Sony's fierce marketing campaigns ensued, and it started to cut into Nintendo and Sega's market share.

1996–2000: Nintendo 64 and Game Boy Color eras

On June 23, 1996, the Nintendo 64 (N64) was released in Japan, selling over 500,000 units on the first day of its release. On September 29, 1996, Nintendo released the Nintendo 64 in North America, selling out the initial shipment of 350,000. Many said that the advertising onslaught by Sony at this time did not truly begin to take effect until many of the consumers who held out for the Nintendo 64 became frustrated at the lack of software following the first few months after the system's release. Nintendo's extremely competitive climate was pushed by many third-party companies immediately developing and releasing many of their leading games for Nintendo's competitors. Many of those third-party companies cited cheaper development and manufacturing costs for the CD format, versus the cartridge format. On December 1, 1999, Nintendo released the 64DD add-on peripheral to the Nintendo 64 in Japan, although it was never released elsewhere.

Nintendo followed with the release of the Game Boy Pocket, a smaller version of the original Game Boy, designed by Gunpei Yokoi as a final product. A week after the release of the Game Boy Pocket, he resigned from his position at Nintendo. He then helped in the creation of the competing handheld WonderSwan.

In 1995, Pocket Monsters (known internationally as "Pokémon") was released in Japan to a huge following. The Pokémon franchise, created by Satoshi Tajiri, was proving so popular in America, Europe, and Japan, that for a brief time, Nintendo took back their place as the supreme power in the games industry.

In 1997, Gunpei Yokoi died in a car accident at the age of 56. That year, the European Economic Community forced Nintendo to drastically rework its third-party licensing contracts, ruling that Nintendo could no longer limit the number of games a license could release, require games to undergo prior approval, or require third-party games to be exclusively manufactured by Nintendo.

On October 13, 1998, the Game Boy Color was released in Japan, with releases in North America and Europe a month later.

2001–2003: Game Boy Advance and GameCube era

Nintendo released the Game Boy Advance in Japan on March 21, 2001, followed by the North American launch on June 11 and the European launch on June 22.

Nintendo released the GameCube home video game console on September 14, 2001, in Japan. It was released in North America on November 18, 2001, Europe on May 3, 2002, and Australia on May 17, 2002.

In January 2002, Minoru Arakawa resigned as president of Nintendo of America, and Nintendo named Tatsumi Kimishima as his successor.

In May 2002, Hiroshi Yamauchi stepped down as the president of Nintendo and named Satoru Iwata his successor.

During the same year, Nintendo and Chinese-American scientist Dr Wei Yen co-founded iQue to manufacture and distribute official Nintendo consoles and games for the mainland Chinese market under the iQue brand. Nintendo's aggressive business tactics in Europe would catch up to them. The European Commission determined that Nintendo had engaged in anticompetitive price-fixing business practices dating at least as far back as the early 1990s. This resulted in a heavy fine being laid against the company — €149 million, one of the largest antitrust fines applied in the history of the commission.

2004–2011: Nintendo DS and Wii era

In May 2004, Nintendo announced plans to release a new brand of handheld, unrelated to the Game Boy, featuring two screens, one of which was touch-sensitive. The Nintendo DS, released on November 21, 2004, received over three million pre-orders. In addition to the touch screen, the DS can also create three-dimensional graphics, similar to those of the Nintendo 64, although its lack of hardware support for texture filtering results in more pixelated graphics than on the Nintendo 64.

President Satoru Iwata reassigned all of Nintendo's software designers under new managers and different division; most of the resources were allocated to Shigeru Miyamoto and Takashi Tezuka and the Nintendo EAD division.

On May 14, 2005, Nintendo opened its first retail store accessible to the general public, Nintendo World Store, at the Rockefeller Center in New York City. It consists of two stories, and contains many kiosks of GameCube, Game Boy Advance, and Nintendo DS games. There are also display cases filled with things from Nintendo's past, including Hanafuda, Nintendo's first product. They celebrated the opening with a block party at Rockefeller Plaza.

At E3 in May 2005, Nintendo displayed the first prototype for their "next-generation" system, codenamed the Nintendo Revolution (now known as the Wii), its controller revealed at the Tokyo Game Show later that year.

On January 26, 2006, Nintendo announced a new version of their Nintendo DS handheld, the Nintendo DS Lite, designed to be smaller and lighter, with a brighter screen. It was launched in Japan on March 2, 2006, and three months later in North America and Europe on June 11 and June 23, 2006, respectively.

On May 25, 2006, Reggie Fils-Aimé was promoted to president and CEO of Nintendo of America, Inc. The former president, Tatsumi Kimishima, was promoted to chairman of the board and CEO.

On July 7, 2006, Nintendo officially established a South Korean subsidiary, Nintendo Korea, in the country's capital, Seoul, which replaced Daewon Media as the official distributor of Nintendo products in South Korea.

In early August 2006, it was revealed that Nintendo, along with Microsoft, was made the target of a patent-infringement lawsuit. Leveled by the Anascape Ltd., the suit claimed that Nintendo's use of analog technology in their game controllers constitutes a violation of their patents. The lawsuit sought to recover damages from both corporations and possibly force them to stop selling controllers with the violating technology. Microsoft settled with Anasacape, while Nintendo went to trial, initially losing and being ordered to pay US$21 million in damages. Nintendo appealed, and on April 23, 2010, the Federal Circuit reversed the ruling. In November 2010, Anascape's appeal to the Supreme Court of the United States was denied.

In mid-September 2006, during press conferences held in Tokyo, New York, and London on 13, 14 and 15 September, respectively, Nintendo announced launch details for its Wii console, as well as demonstrated features of the "Wii Menu" GUI.
The system was first released on November 19, 2006, in the US, followed by the Japanese launch on December 2, the Australian launch on December 6, and the European launch on December 8.

The console sold fast and was a big breakthrough for Nintendo, picking up the pace lost from their last console, the GameCube. The success of the Wii has been attributed to the intended market of the product; while at the time most competitors were focusing on more adult and fan-based games, Nintendo decided to release a console for a larger demographic, one including casual gamers, children and those who wouldn't ordinarily play video games.
Since no other major gaming console was marketing for this image, these other companies were caught mostly unprepared by the success of the Wii system, and it wasn't until 2010 that Sony and Microsoft released consoles targeting the same demographic as the Wii.

On September 17, 2007, Nintendo of America closed its official forums, the NSider Forums, indefinitely due to a major overhaul of their site. For months prior, cutbacks in Nintendo of America's online department led to the trimming back of NSider's chat hours and the replacement of their annual Camp Hyrule event — held during August — with a sweepstakes. In the meantime, Nintendo encouraged fans to run their own forums. Nintendo-Europe's forum section of their site was also officially closed down a week later due to a site revamp, however it had been offline citing "security issues" since June of that year. On December 19, 2007, Nintendo opened a forum for technical support only.

In October 2007, Nintendo announced Nintendo Australia's new managing director, Rose Lappin. She is Nintendo's first female head of one of its subsidiaries and worked for Nintendo before it started in Australia as Director of Sales and Marketing for Mattel and had that role until she was announced managing director.

On November 1, 2008, Nintendo released an updated version of the Nintendo DS Lite in Japan; the Nintendo DSi. It includes all features of the Nintendo DS Lite, but it includes a camera on the inside and outside of the system, and newer features. It is the first handheld game system manufactured by Nintendo that allows downloadable gaming content to the system. The Nintendo DSi was released April 2, 2009, in Australia and Asia, April 3, 2009, in Europe, and April 5, 2009, in North America.

2012–2017: Nintendo 3DS and Wii U era

Project Cafe was announced in 2011, and soon revealed later as the Wii U, an HD console with a new controller, the GamePad. That same year, Nintendo released the 3DS, the first Nintendo handheld with autostereoscopic 3D graphics. Nintendo continued to be successful in the handheld market, and through its decade-long run, 75 million units of the 3DS were sold. By contrast, the Wii U suffered confusing marketing, a lack of third-party support, and very slow consumer adoption. Thus Nintendo quickly gained declining revenues throughout the mid-2010s. The Wii U was discontinued in 2017 as the lowest-selling Nintendo home console with only about 13.5 million sales. On July 11, 2015, Satoru Iwata died from a bile duct tumor at the age of 55. On September 16, Tatsumi Kimishima was named as his replacement.

During the Nintendo 3DS and Wii U era, Nintendo's profits fell to lows not seen during their history as a video game manufacturer, reporting their first net loss as a video game company in 2012. Despite initially claiming that mobile gaming was incompatible with Nintendo's identity, Iwata established a partnership with mobile developer DeNA  to create mobile games based on Nintendo properties prior to his death.

2017–present: Nintendo Switch era

After beginning the conceptual phase of development in 2012, Nintendo announced in a March 2015 press conference that they were developing a dedicated video game system, codenamed "NX". According to Fils-Aimé, the system was a "make or break" console for the company's success, as it was apparent that the Wii U's lifespan would be considerably shorter than average. In April 2016, they revealed that the NX was set for a March 2017 release. The NX was formally unveiled as the Nintendo Switch in October 2016, a hybrid console able to switch between portable and home console play. In a January 2017 event, Nintendo revealed more details about the Nintendo Switch. The Nintendo Switch was released on March 3, 2017—in April 2019, Tencent would receive approval to sell the it in mainland China, and the console released in the region that December.

Following the failure of the 1993 Super Mario Bros. film, Nintendo was wary of creating films based on their franchises, though the Virtual Console service inspired them to pursue other utilizations of their popular software, including film. A partnership between Nintendo and Sony Pictures for a computer-animated Mario film was leaked in 2014, though Nintendo announced in January 2018 that they would be partnering with Illumination to produce an animated Mario film, produced by Shigeru Miyamoto and Chris Meledandri, and distributed by Universal Pictures. Titled "The Super Mario Bros. Movie", the film will release on April 5, 2023, starring Chris Pratt as Mario.

In April 2018, Shuntaro Furukawa succeeded Kimishima as Nintendo President, and in February of the next year, Doug Bowser replaced Fils-Aimé as President and COO of Nintendo of America. ValueAct Capital, a San Francisco-based investment firm, announced in April 2020 that they had purchased  worth of Nintendo stock, or a 2% stake of the company. In May 2022, the Public Investment Fund of the Saudi government purchased a 5% stake in Nintendo. Furukawa claimed in February 2021 that the Nintendo Switch was "in the middle of its life cycle". In 2021, Furukawa said Nintendo plans to explore animated adaptations of their franchises beyond The Super Mario Bros. Movie. Nintendo announced its acquisition of SRD Co., Ltd. in February 2022, who had worked with Nintendo for over 40 years, primarily as a support studio. In July, Nintendo announced its acquisition of the Japanese animation studio Dynamo Pictures, Inc., and renamed the studio to Nintendo Pictures Co., Ltd. following the closure of the acquisition in October.

In January 2020, hotel and restaurant development company Plan See Do announced their intent to refurbish the former headquarters of Marufuku Nintendo as a hotel set to open midway through 2021, and in June 2021, Nintendo announced that the Uji Ogura plant in which the company's playing cards were produced would be transformed into a museum titled the "Nintendo Gallery", to be completed by the end of the 2023 fiscal year.

References

Further reading

External links
 History of Nintendo article at Gameplayer

Nintendo